Jorge Horacio Zorreguieta Stefanini (28 January 1928 – 8 August 2017) was an Argentine politician who served as Secretary of Agriculture in the regime of General Jorge Rafael Videla. Zorreguieta was the father of Queen Máxima of the Netherlands.

Early life 
Jorge Zorreguieta was born in 1928 in Buenos Aires, the son of Cesina María Stefanini Borella and Juan Antonio Zorreguieta Bonorino. He is of Spanish-Basque and Italian ancestry. His paternal grandfather, Amadeo Zorreguieta Hernández, was mayor of the city of Mendoza. He became secretary of La Sociedad Rural Argentina, a conservative interest group of landowners and ranchers. He was also president of the association Juan de Garay, a cultural institution of the Basque community.

Secretary of Agriculture 
After the 1976 Argentine coup d'état of General Videla, Zorreguieta became Deputy Secretary of Agriculture. From March 1979 until March 1981 he was Secretary of Agriculture and Livestock. He was preceded by Mario Cadenas Madariaga, and succeeded by Jorge Aguado as Minister of Agriculture and Livestock.

The INTA, a research institute associated with Zorreguieta's ministry was put under control of the Argentine Navy after the Videla-Coup. Employees from this institute disappeared during Zorreguieta's tenure.

Advisor and director 

In 1981, Zorreguieta stepped down as minister. He became president of the Centro Argentino Azucarero (CAA), an advisory body for sugar producers in Argentina. In April 1982 Argentina went to war with the United Kingdom over the Falkland Islands. Argentina was defeated, and the military government, now headed by Leopoldo Galtieri, collapsed. People who had been ministers under the military government were prosecuted for violations of human rights; Zorreguieta, who had left political office before the end, was not affected.

He also became chairman of the supervisory organization for food Coordinadora de la Industria de Productos Alimenticios (Copal).

Personal life

Marriages and children

Zorreguieta married Marta López Gil (born 1935) in 1956. They later divorced.

They had three daughters:
María Zorreguieta López (born 1956), married to Adrián Vilov, with issue 
Ángeles Zorreguieta López (born 1958)
Dolores Zorreguieta López (born 1965), married to Harmond Grad Lewis, with issue

He married again, to María del Cármen Cerruti Carricart (born 8 September 1944), daughter of Dr. Jorge Horacio Cerruti and María del Cármen Carricart, on 27 May 1970 in Paraguay. They had two daughters and two sons:
Máxima Zorreguieta Cerruti (born 17 May 1971), married in 2002 to King (then Prince) Willem-Alexander of the Netherlands, with issue
Martín Zorreguieta Cerruti (born 1972), married to Mariana Andrés, with issue
Juan Zorreguieta Cerruti (born 1982), married in 2014 to Andrea Wolf, with issue
Inés Zorreguieta Cerruti (1984 – 6 June 2018), found dead at her apartment in Buenos Aires after committing suicide

From his two marriages, Zorreguieta had seven children and twelve grandchildren in total.

Scandal in the Netherlands 

The news of Prince Willem-Alexander's relationship and eventual marriage plans to Máxima Zorreguieta caused controversy in the Netherlands. Máxima's father had been the Minister of Agriculture during the regime of former Argentine President Videla, a military dictator who ruled Argentina from 1976 to 1981 and who was responsible for many atrocities against civilians (An estimated 10,000–30,000 people were kidnapped and murdered during this and subsequent military regimes before democracy was restored to Argentina in 1983). Jorge Zorreguieta had resigned one year before the end of the Videla regime and claimed that, as a civilian, he was unaware of the Dirty War while he was a cabinet minister. Professor , who on request of the Dutch Parliament carried out an inquiry on the involvement of Zorreguieta, concluded that it would have been unlikely for a person in such a powerful position in the government to be unaware of the Dirty War. Despite finding Zorreguieta to be at fault, the marriage between his daughter Máxima and Prince Willem-Alexander was approved by parliament because Máxima herself had not done anything wrong; however Jorge Zorreguieta was not allowed to attend the 2002 wedding. Parliament's approval was necessary for Willem-Alexander to stay in line to the Dutch throne.

Visiting the Netherlands 
Because of his past, Zorreguieta was not allowed to attend Máxima's wedding. However, he and his wife were invited to attend the christening of their granddaughters, the princesses Catharina-Amalia, Alexia, and Ariane. The difference was that the marriage of the heir apparent was seen as a state matter, and a baptism is considered a private matter. During the baptism ceremonies (in The Hague and Wassenaar), opponents of the former Argentine military regime protested. Zorreguieta was not present at the investiture of his son-in-law Willem-Alexander as King of the Netherlands on 30 April 2013 in Amsterdam.

Death
Zorreguieta died of non-Hodgkin lymphoma at the age of 89, on 8 August 2017. He was survived by his second wife and seven children.

References

Other sources
.

1928 births
2017 deaths
20th-century Argentine politicians
Argentine people of Basque descent
Argentine people of Italian descent
Ministers of agriculture of Argentina
Politicians from Buenos Aires
Deaths from cancer in Argentina
Deaths from leukemia